Hương Thanh is a Vietnamese singer of various genres, including Cai Luong and jazz fusion. In 2007, France Musique honored her with the Musique du monde award. Her early discography includes Chuyện ba người (1995), Moon and Wind (ACT Music, 1999), and Tales from Vietnam, de Nguyên Lê (ACT Music, 1996).

Early years and education 
Hương Thanh was born in Saigon to a family of South Vietnamese musicians. Her father, Hữu Phước (died 1997), was a master of Cải lương singing. She has at least one sibling, a sister, Hương Lan. From the age of 10, Hương was trained in Cải Lương and in traditional singing. At the age of 14, she studied at various schools of music and theater, and at 16 she gave her stage debut. In 1977, as a result of the political events in Vietnam, she emigrated to Paris at age 17.

Career

In 1995, she met the Vietnamese guitarist Nguyên Lê, who was her first contact with jazz and world music. In 1996, she sang at the invitation of UNESCO to celebrate the anniversary of the Declaration of Human Rights. With her sister, Hương Lan, she recorded in Los Angeles, California, US in 1997. In the following years, she worked alongside Nguyên Lê with Michel Alibo, Paolo Fresu, Paul McCandless, and Dhafer Youssef. The CD, Fragile Beauty, which was recorded in the duo with Nguyên Lê in 2007, which was finished in the spring of 2008 in the World Music Charts Europe (April 2nd place, May 4th place). In 2007, she received the Prix Musique des Musiques du Monde for her interpretation of the traditional music of Vietnam. This prize is connected with studio recordings and in 2008 the CD Viet Nam was released: Musique Du Théâtre Cai Luong. Here Hương, in collaboration with traditional musicians, interprets some of the most popular pieces of Cải lương and the traditional music of the three regions of Vietnam. With this repertoire, she toured with her Hương Thanh Trio.

Discography

Vietnam music and traditional music 
 Chuyện ba người, 1995
 Chuyện phim buồn, 1996
 Duyên ta như mây, 1996
 Tơ duyên, 1996
 Sao em nỡ vội lấy chồng, 1998
 Viet Nam: Musique du théâtre Cai Luong, Ocora, 2008
 L'Arbre au Rêves, Buda Musique / Universal Music France, 2011

Jazz and world music 
 Moon and Wind, ACT Music, 1999
 Dragonfly, ACT Music, 2001
 Mangustao, ACT Music, 2004
 Fragile Beauty, ACT Music, 2007
 Camkytiwa: Les fleurs du levant, Buda Musique / Universal Music France, 2013

Collaboration 
 Tales from Vietnam, de Nguyên Lê, ACT Music, 1996
 Magreb and Friends, Nguyên Lê, ACT Music, 1998
 Saigon Inspiring,Limborg, Terra Humana, 2006
 Charles Darwin, XII Alfonso, 2012
 A Million Stars, Geir Lysne, ACT Music, 2014
 Vinasounds Vol.1 EP, Nodey/Modulor, 2016

Compilation 

 More Magic In A Noisy World, ACT Music, 1997
 Magic Moments: The Ultimate ACT World Jazz Anthology, Volume IV, ACT Music, 2000
 fRoots N°14, Folk Roots, 2000
 Arôme: Barbara Bui Cafe, Wagram Music, 2001
 Global Magic: The Ultimate ACT World Jazz Anthology, Volume V, ACT Music, 2001
 World 2001, Virgin, 2001
 East Asia Travelogue, Travelogue, 2002
 Man Ray, Volume 2, Universal Licensing Music (ULM), Milan Records, 2002
 Little Buddha Cafe (DJ Sam-Popat), George V Records, 2002
 La Planète Bleue, Volume 2, Wagram Music, 2003
 Magic Voices, ACT Music, 2003
 FIP Selection Musiques du Monde Vol.1, FIP, 2003 
 Magic Moments 2: The Ultimate ACT World Jazz Anthology, Volume VI, ACT Music, 2004
 GEO [World], EMI Music, 2004
 Asian Garden: The World of Asian Grooves, Soulstar, 2004
 Harem's Secret, Volume 1, Soulstar, 2004
 The Very Best of The Far East, Nascente, 2004
 Magic Moments: 3 CD Box, ACT Music, 2005
 Jet Lag Inspiring Saigon, Believe, 2006
 ACT: 15 Magic Years 1992-2007, ACT Music, 2007
 The Rough Guide to the Music of Vietnam, World Music Network, 2007
 Songlines: Top of the World 48, Songlines, 2007
 Chill Out in Paris 7: Kings of Lounge, the Secret Garden, Stefano Cecchi Records, 2008
 Divas du monde, RCA Victor, 2008
 Songlines: Great Moments in World Music, Songlines, 2008
 Supperclub Presents Nomads 6, United Recordings, 2009

Honors
2007, Musique du monde award, France Musique

References

External links

Official website

Living people
20th-century births
People from Ho Chi Minh City
20th-century Vietnamese women singers
Year of birth missing (living people)
ACT Music artists
21st-century Vietnamese women singers
Vietnamese emigrants to France